Zhaozong is a temple name used for several Chinese monarchs. It may refer to:

Emperor Zhaozong of Tang (867–904, reigned 888–904), Tang dynasty emperor
Emperor Mo of Jin (died 1234, reigned in 1234), emperor of the Jurchen-led Jin dynasty (1115–1234)
Biligtü Khan Ayushiridara (1340–1378, reigned 1370–1378), emperor of the Northern Yuan dynasty
Zhu Youlang (1623–1662, reigned 1646–1662), Southern Ming emperor

Temple name disambiguation pages